This article lists the latest women's squads lists for badminton's 2018 Badminton Asia Team Championships.

Group W
Group W consists of Japan, 
India 
and 
Hong Kong.

Japan

India

Hong Kong

Group X
Group X consists of Korea, 
Chinese Taipei 
and 
Maldives.

Korea

Chinese Taipei

Maldives

Group Y
Group Y consists of Thailand, 
Malaysia, 
Vietnam 
and 
Philippines.

Thailand

Malaysia

Vietnam

Philippines

Group Z
Group Z consists of China, 
Indonesia 
and 
Singapore.

China

Indonesia

Singapore

References

2018 Badminton Asia Team Championships